Greveniti is a village and a community of the Zagori municipality in Ioannina Regional Unit, Greece. Before the 2011 local government reform it was part of the municipality of East Zagori, of which it was a municipal district. The 2011 census recorded 193 inhabitants in the village. The community of Greveniti covers an area of 37.077 km2. Greveniti is a traditional Aromanian (Vlach) settlement.

See also
List of settlements in the Ioannina regional unit

References

Populated places in Ioannina (regional unit)
Aromanian settlements in Greece